Broadway Market was established in 1786 in Fells Point,  Baltimore, United States, and was most recently renovated in 2019 after being shuttered for nearly a decade. The market currently consists of two separate shed buildings featuring various food retail options within. The market is managed by the Baltimore Public Markets Corporation, a non-profit operating on behalf of the City of Baltimore.

See also
 Baltimore Public Markets

References

Buildings and structures in Baltimore
Middle East, Baltimore
Food markets in the United States

Market halls
Food retailers